
Kołobrzeg County is a unit of territorial administration and local government (powiat) in West Pomeranian Voivodeship, north-western Poland, on the Baltic coast. It came into being on January 1, 1999, as a result of the Polish local government reforms passed in 1998. Its only other town is Gościno.

As of 2006 its total population was 76,089, out of which the population of Kołobrzeg was 44,794 and the rural population was 31,295.

Neighbouring counties
Kołobrzeg County is bordered by Koszalin County to the east, Białogard County to the south-east, Świdwin County and Łobez County to the south, and Gryfice County to the south-west. It also borders the Baltic Sea to the north.

Administrative division
The county is subdivided into seven gminas (one urban, one urban-rural and five rural). These are listed in the following table, in descending order of population.

References
Polish official population figures 2006

 
Land counties of West Pomeranian Voivodeship